Earl of Huntingdon is a title which has been created several times in the Peerage of England. The medieval title (1065 creation) was associated with the ruling house of Scotland (David of Scotland).

The seventh and most recent creation dates to 1529. In this lineage, the current holder of the title is William Hastings-Bass, 17th Earl of Huntingdon (b. 1948).

In English folklore, the title has been associated with Robin Hood, whose true name is often given as "Robert of Huntingdon", though alternatively Robin is said to be from Locksley or Loxley.

Early history

Huntingdonshire was part of the Kingdom of East Anglia, inhabited by a group known as the Gyrwas from about the 6th century. It fell to the Danes in the 9th century, but was re-conquered under Edward the Elder in 915. An earldom of Huntingdon was established shortly after, and it was one of the seven earldoms of Saxon England during the reign of king Edward the Confessor. 
It was created for Beorn Estrithson, cousin to Harold Godwinson (later King Harold). 
The earldom at that time carried extensive powers and covered a wide area of the East Midlands, covering the counties of Northamptonshire and Bedfordshire as well as Huntingdonshire.

First creation (1065)
In 1065 the earldom passed to Waltheof, son of Siward, Earl of Northumbria. Waltheof kept his title following the Conquest in 1066, and even after his rebellion in 1067, and married Judith, King William's niece. However, after the second rebellion in 1076, he was executed and the earldom was reduced in size and power.

The earldom was inherited by Waltheof's daughter Maud, countess of Huntingdon, and passed to her husbands in turn, first Simon de Senlis and then David King of Scotland.

Following her death, and during the reigns of Matilda and Stephen and the anarchy that ensued, the earldom was the subject of dispute between Maud's sons Simon II and Henry the prince, and was held by both at various times. In the reign of Henry II, following the death of Simon II, it was settled on the Scottish house, and the sons of Prince Henry: first Malcolm, then William, then David. With the death of David's childless son John in 1237, the title was not passed on and became extinct.

Waltheof (d. 1076)
Judith of Lens, Countess of Huntingdon (c.1055–after 1086)
Maud, Countess of Huntingdon (c.1074–1130/31) 
 m. Simon I de Senlis, Earl of Huntingdon-Northampton (died c.1111)
 m. David I of Scotland (c. 1084–1153)
Henry, Earl of Northumbria (1114–1152)
Simon II de Senlis, Earl of Huntingdon-Northampton (4th Earl) (c.1098–1153) 
Malcolm IV of Scotland (1141–1165)
William I of Scotland (c.1142–1214)
Simon III de Senlis (succeeded in 1174, upon the forfeiture by William who had succeeded as king of Scotland.)
David of Scotland, Earl of Huntingdon (8th Earl) (1144–1219)
John of Scotland, Earl of Huntingdon (9th Earl) (1207–1237)

Second creation (1337)
William de Clinton, Earl of Huntingdon (1304–1354)

Third creation (1377)
Guichard d'Angle, Earl of Huntingdon (d. 1380) (Life Peerage)

Fourth creation (1388)
John Holland, 1st Duke of Exeter, 1st Earl of Huntingdon (c.1352–1400) (forfeit 1400)
John Holland, 2nd Duke of Exeter, 2nd Earl of Huntingdon (1395–1447) (restored 1416)
Henry Holland, 3rd Duke of Exeter, 3rd Earl of Huntingdon (1430–1475) (forfeit 1461)

Fifth creation (1471)
see Marquess of Dorset, third creation (1475)

Sixth creation (1479)

William Herbert (1451–1491) (created Earl in compensation for surrendering the Earldom of Pembroke to Edward IV.

Seventh creation (1529)

The title was re-created for George Hastings, 3rd Baron Hastings, 5th Baron Hungerford, 6th Baron Botreaux and 3rd Baron de Moleyns. He fought in the French Wars of Henry VIII, and was part of the royalist suppression of the rebellion known as the Pilgrimage of Grace. In 1529 the King created him Earl of Huntingdon in the Peerage of England. His eldest son, the second Earl, was a lieutenant-general and served as Commander-in-Chief of the Army. Lord Huntingdon married Catherine, daughter and co-heiress of Henry Pole, 1st Baron Montagu, son of Sir Richard Pole and Margaret Pole, 8th Countess of Salisbury, daughter and sole heiress of George, Duke of Clarence, brother of King Edward IV. On his death the titles passed to his son, the third Earl. He was a possible heir presumptive to the crown through his mother, though Elizabeth I never acknowledged his claim officially. Lord Huntingdon was one of the custodians of Mary, Queen of Scots, and also served as President of the Council of the North. He was succeeded by his younger brother, the fourth Earl. He represented Derbyshire and Leicestershire in the House of Commons and served as Lord-Lieutenant of Rutland and Leicestershire.

When he died the titles passed to his grandson, the fifth Earl. He was the son of Francis Hastings, Lord Hastings (d. 1595). Lord Huntingdon was also Lord-Lieutenant of Leicestershire and Rutland. He was succeeded by his eldest son, the sixth Earl. He sat as Member of Parliament for Leicestershire. His son, the seventh Earl, and also served as Lord-Lieutenant of Leicestershire and Derbyshire. He was succeeded by his eldest son, the eighth Earl. He carried the Sceptre at the Coronation of Queen Anne but died at an early age. He was succeeded by his half-brother, the ninth Earl. He carried the Sword of State at the Coronation of King George II. His son, the tenth Earl, was a courtier and notably served as Master of the Horse. He had no legitimate male issue and on his death in 1789 the earldom became dormant. He was succeeded in the baronies of Hastings, Hungerford, de Moleyns and Botreaux by his sister Lady Elizabeth, wife of The 1st Earl of Moira.

The earldom was assumed by the tenth Earl's distant relative (his fifth cousin once removed) Reverend Theophilus Henry Hastings. He was the great-great-great-grandson of Sir Edward Hastings (d. 1603), younger son of the second Earl. He is by some sources considered as the de jure eleventh Earl while some sources do not include him in the numbering of the Earls. On his death, the claim passed to his nephew Hans Francis Hastings, son of George Hastings. He was allowed to take his seat in the House of Lords as the Earl of Huntingdon in 1819. Depending on the sources he is numbered as the eleventh or twelfth Earl. Lord Huntingdon served as Governor of Jamaica from 1822 to 1824.

The next Earl was Hans' great-great-grandson (the titles having descended from father to son), the sixteenth (or fifteenth Earl), was an artist, academic and Labour politician. He died without male issue in 1990 and was succeeded by his first cousin once removed, the seventeenth (or sixteenth) and  present holder of the title. He is the uncle of television presenter Clare Balding and eldest son of Captain Peter Robin Hood Hastings Bass (1920–1964) (who assumed the additional surname of Bass, which was that of his uncle by marriage, Sir William Bass, 2nd Baronet, by deed poll in 1954), son of Aubrey Craven Theophilus Robin Hood Hastings (1878–1929), younger son of the fourteenth Earl.

Several other members of the Hastings family may be mentioned. The Hon. Edward Hastings, third son of the first Earl, was created Baron Hastings of Loughborough in 1558. Richard Hastings, a grandson of Sir Edward Hastings, younger son of the second Earl, was created a baronet in 1667 (see Hastings baronets). The Hon. Henry Hastings, second son of the fifth Earl, was created Baron Loughborough in 1643. Lucy Hastings, Countess of Huntingdon, wife of the sixth Earl, was a poet. Selina Hastings, Countess of Huntingdon, wife of the ninth Earl, was a Methodist leader and the founder of the Countess of Huntingdon's Connexion. Charles Hastings, illegitimate son of the tenth Earl, was a distinguished soldier and was created a baronet in 1806 (see Abney-Hastings baronets). The Hon. George Fowler Hastings, second son of the twelfth (or eleventh) Earl, was a vice-admiral in the Royal Navy. Alexander Plantagenet Hastings (1843–1928), son of Captain the Hon. Edward Plantagenet Robin Hood Hastings (1818–1857), third son of the twelfth (or eleventh) Earl, was an admiral in the Royal Navy. His son Edward George Godolphin Hastings (1887–1973) was a captain in the Royal Navy.

The Earl possesses no subsidiary titles, but his eldest son uses the invented courtesy title of Viscount Hastings to avoid confusion, there already being a Baron Hastings.

The family seat of the present line is at Hodcott House, near West Ilsley, in Berkshire.

George Hastings, 1st Earl of Huntingdon (1488–1544)
Francis Hastings, 2nd Earl of Huntingdon (1514–1560)
Henry Hastings, 3rd Earl of Huntingdon (1536–1595)
George Hastings, 4th Earl of Huntingdon (1540–1604)
Henry Hastings, 5th Earl of Huntingdon (1586–1643)
Ferdinando Hastings, 6th Earl of Huntingdon (1609–1656)
Theophilus Hastings, 7th Earl of Huntingdon (1650–1701)
George Hastings, 8th Earl of Huntingdon (1677–1705)
Theophilus Hastings, 9th Earl of Huntingdon (1696–1746)
Francis Hastings, 10th Earl of Huntingdon (1729–1789) (dormant)
Theophilus Henry Hastings, de jure 11th Earl of Huntingdon (1728–1804)
Hans Francis Hastings, 12th Earl of Huntingdon (1779–1828) (confirmed in title 1819)
Francis Theophilus Henry Hastings, 13th Earl of Huntingdon (1808–1875)
Francis Power Plantagenet Hastings, 14th Earl of Huntingdon (1841–1885)
Warner Francis John Plantagenet Hastings, 15th Earl of Huntingdon (1868–1939)
Francis John Clarence Westenra Plantagenet Hastings, 16th Earl of Huntingdon (1901–1990)
William Edward Robin Hood Hastings-Bass, 17th Earl of Huntingdon (b. 1948)

The heir presumptive is the present holder's brother the Hon. John Peter Robin Hood Hastings-Bass (b. 1954).
The heir presumptive's heir is his cousin Adam Francis Hastings (b. 1977), a great-great-great-grandson of the 12th Earl.

Line of succession

 Hans Hastings, 12th Earl of Huntingdon (1779–1828)
 Francis Hastings, 13th Earl of Huntingdon (1808–1875)
 Francis Hastings, 14th Earl of Huntingdon (1841–1885)
Hon. Aubrey Craven Theophilus Robin Hood Hastings (1878–1929)
Peter Robin Hood Hastings-Bass (1920–1964)
 William Hastings-Bass, 17th Earl of Huntingdon (b. 1948)
(1). Hon. John Peter Robin Hood Hastings-Bass (b. 1954)
Hon. George Fowler Hastings (1814–1876)
Hans Francis Hastings (1865–1933)
 George Godolphin Hastings (1905–1981)
Warren Francis Hastings (1938–2005)
(2). Adam Francis Hastings (b. 1977)
 Rev. Hon. Richard Godolphin Henry Hastings (1820–1865)
Henry John Churchill Hastings (1856–1924)
 Henry Theophilus James Hastings (1910–1977)
(3). David Walter Theophilus Hastings (b. 1947)
(4). Ian David Hastings (b. 1975)

Family tree of the earls of Huntingdon (seventh creation)

See also

Baron Hastings
Baron Hungerford
Baron Botreaux
Baron de Moleyns
Hastings baronets
Abney-Hastings baronets
Britain's Real Monarch – argues that 3rd–10th Earls should have been the monarchs of England
Countess of Huntingdon
Maud, Countess of Huntingdon
Selina Hastings, Countess of Huntingdon
Huntington family

Arms

Popular culture 
In English folklore, the title has been associated with Robin Hood, whose true name is often given as "Robert of Huntingdon", though alternatively Robin is said to be from Locksley or Loxley. It was used in the 1980s ITV TV series Robin of Sherwood starring Jason Connery as Robert, who succeeds Robin of Loxley (Michael Praed) in the role of Robin Hood.

References

Work cited

External links 
Britannia

 

Earldoms in England before 1066
Earldoms in the Peerage of England
Extinct earldoms in the Peerage of England
Noble titles created in 1337
Noble titles created in 1377
Noble titles created in 1388
Noble titles created in 1471
Noble titles created in 1479
Noble titles created in 1529
Earl
Forfeited earldoms in the Peerage of England